Pori is a village in Tõrva Parish, Valga County, in southern Estonia. It has a population of 56 (as of 1 January 2012).

References

Villages in Valga County